The 2014–2015 Season of Mansfield Town F.C. will be its second back in the Football League, following promotion as champions from the Blue Square Bet Premier at the end of the 2012–13 season. The club will take part in the FA Cup, the League Cup and the Football League Trophy. The club will play its home games at Field Mill, renamed the One Call Stadium for sponsorship reasons, the oldest ground in the Football League.

Pre-season friendlies
† Trialist, ‡ Youth Team player, * Mansfield Town XI

Results

League Two

League table

FA Cup

League Cup

League Trophy

Squad statistics

Transfers

In

Out

References

Mansfield Town F.C. seasons
Mans